WXRV (92.5 FM; "The River") is an adult album alternative radio station licensed to Andover, Massachusetts, and based in Haverhill, with a signal covering most of northeast Massachusetts and southern New Hampshire, and audible as far away as Plymouth, Massachusetts, and Portland, Maine.

Background 
The station's slogan is "Independent Radio", proclaiming its status as being a single station separate from the large mass-media conglomerates such as iHeartMedia and Audacy with freedom from the idea of corporate playlists and national content. This enables WXRV to play a very wide variety of music, ranging from blues and folk to contemporary alternative and classic rock, as well as songs from numerous local musicians and lesser-known musical acts.

Despite the station's transmitter location, WXRV attempts to primarily serve the Greater Boston area; its signal also reaches into the nearby Manchester and Portsmouth markets. To overcome signal issues near Boston, the station applied for four on-channel booster stations in the Boston and MetroWest areas in August 2015.

The studios are still located in Haverhill, in the original WHAV art deco building. The current station inherited a facility on the top floor of its studio now called the River Music Hall, which was designed for broadcasting live performances in the pre-rock era, and is used today to broadcast live performances and to record performances for later broadcast. In 2007, their studio location began using photo-voltaic solar power for a portion of the station's power consumption, making it one of the few such solar-powered radio stations in the world at the time.

Starting in 2001 the River began its Riverfest Festival each summer. It is held in Newburyport, Massachusetts, and has had performers such as Matt Nathanson, Eric Hutchinson, Fastball, Barenaked Ladies, Anderson East, Phillip Phillips, and the Sam Roberts Band appear.

As of 2022, WXRV has an eight-person on-air staff, most of whom share weekday and weekend duties: Dana Marshall (host of the Sunday morning Brunch By the River program), Charlie Wilde, Carolyn Morrell, AJ Crosby, and Graeme Bentley. Current substitute hosts are Duncan, Stephanie Battaglia, and Lori D. Past on-air personalities include Annalisa Pop and Rita Cary.

Broadcast history 
Originating in 1947 as WHAV, an AM station in Haverhill, an FM station was founded in 1948, but went dark in the early 1950s. The FM station was restored on its current frequency in 1959, it became soft rock-formatted WLYT (Lite 92.5) in 1983, and gained its current identity as WXRV on August 1, 1995, presumably taking the River moniker from the nearby Merrimack River (though with its wider reach, it uses Boston's Charles River for publicity purposes), but some say that the "river" moniker is for its diverse format of music that winds back and forth flowing like a river.

WLKC (105.7 FM), licensed to Campton, New Hampshire, simulcast WXRV from 1999 until 2021. For a brief time during 2012–13, the station was programmed separately (though retaining the "River" branding and AAA format), before returning to the WXRV simulcast. In 2014, Northeast Broadcasting acquired a second New Hampshire station, WWHK (102.3 FM) in Concord; that station began broadcasting WXRV programming on May 2, 2014, though WWHK broadcasts separate news, weather, and advertising. Later that month, WXRV added a translator in Needham, Massachusetts, W243DC (96.5 FM). On March 28, 2016, WWHK changed its call letters to WXRG.

From April 2008 until May 2014, WXRV simulcast in the northwest part of Central Massachusetts on WFNX (99.9 FM), licensed to Athol, Massachusetts, which itself was rebroadcast on daytime station WWBZ (700 AM) in Orange and Athol starting in late 2011. The WFNX call letters were previously used by an alternative rock station in Boston owned by the Boston Phoenix, first on 101.7 FM (now WBWL) and later as an Internet radio station; Northeast Broadcasting acquired the call letters in April 2013 after that station shut down along with the Phoenix. Before then, the station had been known as WXRG, while WWBZ was known as WTUB until April 2014. WFNX and WWBZ dropped the WXRV simulcast in May 2014 and began stunting with a wide range of music while preparing to launch new formats for the stations on June 9, with listeners being asked to vote on which of the songs being played should be included in the new formats. In May 2016, WFNX announced that it would end the variety hits format after May 29, 2016 and return to simulcasting WXRV, citing a lack of advertiser support, in its announcement, WFNX said it needed ten businesses to advertise on the stations on an annual basis to cover their operations costs. WFAT (the former WWBZ) concurrently announced that it would also resume a simulcast of WXRV, but continued to broadcast its oldies format until Northeast Broadcasting sold it to Saga Communications in January 2019 (the station is now WQVD). WFNX continued simulcasting WXRV until 2020, when it was sold to the Educational Media Foundation and became K-Love station WKMY.

For several months after Northeast Broadcasting acquired WKBR (1250 AM) in Manchester, New Hampshire in 1997, that station offered a temporary simulcast of WXRV. The station is now separately-owned WGAM.

See also
 WLKC — 105.7 FM, "River" affiliate station, licensed to  Campton, New Hampshire

References

External links
 
 WHAV History

 
 

XRV
XRV
Adult album alternative radio stations in the United States
Radio stations established in 1959
Mass media in Essex County, Massachusetts
Andover, Massachusetts
Haverhill, Massachusetts
1959 establishments in Massachusetts